Serhiy Leonidovych Kotenko (16 July 1967 – 9 March 2022) was a Colonel of the Armed Forces of Ukraine and participant in the 2022 Russian-Ukrainian war who posthumously received the Hero of Ukraine on 16 March 2022. Prior to the war, he was head of the Haisyn District State Administration (2014–2015) and Commander of the 9th SMIB.

Biography 
Serhiy Kotenko was born in Haisyn, Vinnytsia Oblast. He graduated from Kamianets-Podilskyi Higher Military Engineering Command School in 1989. He served in the army for 22 years. In 2014–2015, he headed the Haisyn Regional State Administration, and later returned to military service. Commander of the 9th Separate Motorized Infantry Battalion "Vinnytsa Scythians".

From 24 February 2022, he took part in the Russian-Ukrainian war. He died on 9 March 2022, in a battle with Russian forces near Zaporizhia. He was buried on 11 March in the town of Haisyn, Vinnytsia region. Two days earlier, his brother Oleksandr Kotenko, serving in the Aidar Battalion, was killed in action near Mykolaiv.

In December 2022 a street in Kyiv that was named after Russian general Alexander Suvorov was renamed to Serhiy Kotenko Street.

Awards 

 The title of "Hero of Ukraine" with the deigning Order of the Golden Star (2022, posthumously) for personal courage and heroism shown in defending the state sovereignty and territorial integrity of Ukraine, loyalty to the military oath.
 Order of Bohdan Khmelnytsky III degree (2019) for significant personal merits in defending the state sovereignty and territorial integrity of Ukraine, civic courage, dedication to upholding the constitutional principles of democracy, human rights and freedoms, significant contribution to cultural and educational development, active volunteering.

References 

1967 births
2022 deaths
People from Vinnytsia Oblast
Recipients of the title of Hero of Ukraine
Ukrainian military personnel killed in the 2022 Russian invasion of Ukraine